Trail to Gunsight is a 1944 American Western film directed by Vernon Keays and written by Bennett Cohen and Patricia Harper. The film stars Eddie Dew, Lyle Talbot, Fuzzy Knight, Ray Whitley, Maris Wrixon, Robert 'Buzz' Henry, Marie Austin, Sarah Padden and Glenn Strange. The film was released on August 18, 1944, by Universal Pictures.

Plot

Cast        
Eddie Dew as Dan Creede
Lyle Talbot as Bill Hollister
Fuzzy Knight as Horatius Van Sickle
Ray Whitley as Barton
Maris Wrixon as Mary Wagner
Robert 'Buzz' Henry as Tim Wagner
Marie Austin as Clementine Van Sickle
Sarah Padden as Ma Wagner
Glenn Strange as Duke Ellis
Ray Bennett as Bert Nelson
Charles Morton as Reb Tanner
Ezra Paulette as Accordion player 
Aleth Hansen as Mandolin Player
Charles Quirk as Guitar Player

References

External links
 

1944 films
American Western (genre) films
1944 Western (genre) films
Universal Pictures films
Films directed by Vernon Keays
American black-and-white films
1940s English-language films
1940s American films